The association football tournament at the 2020 Summer Olympics was held from 21 July to 7 August 2021 in Japan.

In addition to the Olympic host city of Tokyo, matches were also played in Kashima, Saitama, Sapporo, Rifu and Yokohama.

Associations affiliated with FIFA may send teams to participate in the tournament. There were no age restrictions on women's teams, while men's teams were restricted to under-24 players (born on or after 1 January 1997) with a maximum of three overage players allowed. The men's tournament is typically restricted to under-23 players, though following the postponement of the Olympics by a year, FIFA decided to maintain the restriction of players born on or after 1 January 1997. In June 2020, FIFA approved the use of the video assistant referee (VAR) system at the Olympics. Teams were restricted to 18 athletes, however due to the COVID-19 pandemic, rosters were allowed to consist of up to 22 athletes.

Brazil was the men's defending champions. Germany won the previous women's tournament, but failed to qualify after losing to Sweden in the quarter-finals of the 2019 FIFA Women's World Cup.

Schedule

Venues
A total of six venues were used:

Qualification
The Organizing Committee for FIFA Competitions ratified the distribution of spots at their meeting on 14 September 2017.

Summary

Men's qualification

In addition to the host nation Japan, 15 men's national teams qualified from six separate continental confederations.

Women's qualification

In addition to hosts Japan, 11 women's national teams qualified from six separate continental confederations.

For the first time, as per an agreement between the four British football associations (England, Northern Ireland, Scotland and Wales), Great Britain qualified for the Olympics through England's performance in the World Cup (a procedure already successfully employed by Team GB in field hockey and rugby sevens). Scotland also participated in the World Cup but, under the agreement whereby the highest ranked home nation is nominated to compete for the purposes of Olympic qualification, their performance was not taken into account.

Final draw
The draws for the men's and women's tournaments was held on 21 April 2021, 10:00 CEST (UTC+2), at the FIFA headquarters in Zürich, Switzerland.

Medal summary

Medal table

Medalists

Men's competition

The competition consisted of two stages: a group stage with four groups of four teams, followed by a knockout stage contested by eight teams which advanced as group winners and runners-up. The 16 teams were drawn into four groups of four teams. The hosts Japan were automatically seeded into Pot 1 and assigned to position A1, while the remaining teams were seeded into their respective pots based on their results in the last five Olympics (more recent tournaments weighted more heavily), with bonus points awarded to confederation champions. No group could contain more than one team from each confederation.

Group stage

Group A

Group B

Group C

Group D

Women's competition

The competition consisted of two stages: a group stage with three groups of four teams, followed by a knockout stage contested by eight teams which advanced as group winners and runners-up plus the two best third-placed teams. The 12 teams will be drawn into three groups of four teams. The hosts Japan were automatically seeded into Pot 1 and assigned to position E1, while the remaining teams were seeded into their respective pots based on the FIFA Women's World Rankings released on 16 April 2021. As Great Britain are not a FIFA member and therefore do not have a ranking, they would be seeded based on the FIFA ranking of England, who qualified on behalf of Great Britain. No group could contain more than one team from each confederation.

Group stage

Group E

Group F

Group G

Knockout stage

See also
Football at the 2018 Asian Games
Football at the 2019 African Games
Football at the 2019 Pan American Games
Football 5-a-side at the 2020 Summer Paralympics

References

External links

Tokyo 2020
Olympic Football Tournaments Tokyo 2020 - Men, FIFA.com
Olympic Football Tournaments Tokyo 2020 - Women, FIFA.com
Results book 

 
2020
Summer Olympics
Football
2020
Olympics